Georges Désiré "Géo" Malfait (9 December 1878 – 7 December 1946) was a French sprinter. He competed in 100–400 m events at the 1906, 1908 and 1912 Summer Olympics, but failed to reach the finals. Malfait won the national titles in 100 m in 1904 and 1905 and in 400 m in 1905.

References

1878 births
1946 deaths
Sportspeople from Roubaix
French male sprinters
Olympic athletes of France
Athletes (track and field) at the 1906 Intercalated Games
Athletes (track and field) at the 1908 Summer Olympics
Athletes (track and field) at the 1912 Summer Olympics